Gustavo Szczygielski (born 28 September 1967) is a Uruguayan former basketball player.

References

1967 births
Living people
Uruguayan people of Polish descent
Uruguayan men's basketball players
Basketball players at the 1987 Pan American Games
Basketball players at the 1991 Pan American Games
Basketball players at the 1995 Pan American Games
Pan American Games competitors for Uruguay